In the terminology of linguistic anthropology, linguistic racism is the use of language resources for discrimination. The most evident manifestation of this kind of racism are racial slurs, however there are covert forms of it. 

Overt linguistic racism may be expressed in the form of mocking, teasing, laughing, joking, ridiculing, and interrupting. Covert linguistic racism, on the other hand, is expressed through indirect and passive-aggressive acts of social exclusion. In the U.S., covert linguistic racism plays a role in a lack of diverse participation in large studies or political participation as sufficient access to translations is often excluded.  Counties with higher than average minority population percentages and counties with lower percentages in English-speaking residents have lower participation rates in survey participation due to lack of accommodation or outreach.

Andrea Moro in his essay "La Razza e la lingua" ("Race and Language") shows that there are two ideas which look innocuous if considered as separated but which are extremely dangerous if combined: first, that there are languages which are better than others; second, that reality is perceived and elaborated differently, according to the language one speaks. He highlights that this linguistic racism was at the origin of the myth of Aryan race and the devastating results it had on civilization.

The works of Jane H. Hill on "mock Spanish", of Barbara A. Meek on "Hollywood Injun English", of Ronkin and Kan on parodies of Ebonics, of Elaine Chun "Ideologies of Legitimate Mockery" on "mock Asian", etc., demonstrate how parodying or re-appropriating non-English languages contributes to presenting certain cultures as inferior to European Americans by disparaging their languages.

See also
 Mock language
Linguistic imperialism
Linguistic discrimination

References

Further reading
International Journal of Bilingual Education and Bilingualism, Volume 23, 2020 – Issue 7: "Linguistic racism", 

Linguistic discrimination
Racism